Miles James was an African American Union Army soldier during the American Civil War and a recipient of the Medal of Honor for his actions at the Battle of Chaffin's Farm.

Biography
James joined the Army in Norfolk, Virginia, and by September 30, 1864, he was serving as a Corporal in Company B of the 36th United States Colored Troops. On that day, his unit participated in the Battle of Chaffin's Farm in Virginia, where he was seriously wounded, resulting in the amputation of his left arm. Six months after the battle, on April 6, 1865, James was issued the Medal of Honor for his actions at Chaffin's Farm. He was discharged for disability the following October.

Medal of Honor citation
Rank and organization: Corporal, Company B, 36th U.S. Colored Troops. Place and date: At Chapins Farm, Va., September 30, 1864. Entered service at: Norfolk, Va. Birth: Princess Anne County, Va. Date of issue: April 6, 1865.

Citation:

Having had his arm mutilated, making immediate amputation necessary, he loaded and discharged his piece with one hand and urged his men forward; this within  of the enemy's works.

See also

List of American Civil War Medal of Honor recipients: G–L
List of African American Medal of Honor recipients
Melvin Claxton and Mark Puls, Uncommon valor : a story of race, patriotism, and glory in the final battles of the Civil War, (Wiley, 2006)

Notes

References

1829 births
1871 deaths
African Americans in the American Civil War
American amputees
United States Army Medal of Honor recipients
Union Army soldiers
People from Virginia Beach, Virginia
American Civil War recipients of the Medal of Honor